Alloteratura is a genus of Asian bush crickets belonging to the tribe Meconematini (subfamily Meconematinae). They are found in India, China, Indochina, and Malesia to New Guinea.

Species
The Orthoptera Species File includes:
Subgenus Alloteratura (Alloteratura) Hebard, 1922
 Alloteratura angulata Jin, 1995
 Alloteratura bachma Gorochov, 2005
 Alloteratura bakeri Hebard, 1922 – type species
 Alloteratura belalongensis Tan, Gorochov & Wahab, 2017
 Alloteratura carinata Gorochov, 2008
 Alloteratura cervus Gorochov, 1998
 Alloteratura cylindracauda Jin, 1995
 Alloteratura flabellata Xin & Shi, 2019
 Alloteratura gigliotosi (Karny, 1924)
 Alloteratura hebardi Gorochov, 1998
 Alloteratura karnyi Kästner, 1932
 Alloteratura keyica (Karny, 1924)
 Alloteratura klankamsorni Sänger & Helfert, 2004
 Alloteratura kuehnelti Sänger & Helfert, 1996
 Alloteratura lamellata Jin, 1995
 Alloteratura longicercata (Bolívar, 1905)
 Alloteratura megaspina Gorochov, 2016
 Alloteratura multispina Jin, 1995
 Alloteratura muntiacus Gorochov, 1998
 Alloteratura parvispina Gorochov, 2016
 Alloteratura penangica Hebard, 1922
 Alloteratura plauta Jin, 1995
 Alloteratura podgornajae Gorochov, 1993
 Alloteratura quaternispina Shi, Di & Chang, 2014
 Alloteratura siamensis Jin, 1995
 Alloteratura simplex (Karny, 1920)
 Alloteratura stebaevi Gorochov, 1993
 Alloteratura subanalis (Karny, 1926)
 Alloteratura tahanensis (Karny, 1926)
 Alloteratura tibetensis Jin, 1995
 Alloteratura triloba (Karny, 1926)
 Alloteratura vietnami Gorochov, 2016
 Alloteratura werneri (Karny, 1924)
 Alloteratura xiphidiopsis (Karny, 1920)
Subgenus Alloteratura (Meconemopsis) Karny, 1922
 Alloteratura bispina Gorochov, 1993
 Alloteratura borellii (Karny, 1924)
 Alloteratura breviuscula Gorochov, 2016
 Alloteratura curta Gorochov, 2008
 Alloteratura dawwruengi Tan & Artchawakom, 2017
 Alloteratura eubispina Gorochov, 2016
 Alloteratura kalabakanica Jin, 2020
 Alloteratura kevani Jin, 2020
 Alloteratura media Gorochov, 2008
 Alloteratura nigrigutta (Karny, 1924)
 Alloteratura pentadactyla Xin & Shi, 2019
 Alloteratura longa Gorochov, 2008
 Alloteratura sandakanae Hebard, 1922
 Alloteratura sarawaki Gorochov, 2016
Subgenus not assigned
 Alloteratura cyclolabia (Karny, 1923)
 Alloteratura delicatula (Chopard, 1924)
 Alloteratura longicauda (Karny, 1924)
 Alloteratura nepalica Kevan & Jin, 1993
 Alloteratura nigrivertex (Karny, 1924)
 Alloteratura sinica (Bey-Bienko, 1957)
 Alloteratura thanjavuensis Kevan & Jin, 1993

References

External links

Meconematinae
Tettigoniidae genera
Orthoptera of Asia
Insects of Papua New Guinea